Pseudaspididae is a small family of elapoid snakes. They were formerly placed as a subfamily of the Lamprophiidae, but have been more recently identified as a distinct family. 

They have a disjunct distribution; two species (each in their own monotypic genus) are known from sub-Saharan Africa, while the two Psammodynastes species inhabit Southeast Asia.

Genera

The family contains four species in three genera.

 Pseudaspis Fitzinger, 1843
 Pseudaspis cana (Linnaeus, 1758) (mole snake)
 Pythonodipsas Günther, 1868
 Pythonodipsas carinata Günther, 1868 (western keeled snake)
 Psammodynastes Günther, 1858
 Psammodynastes pictus Günther, 1858 (painted mock viper, spotted mock viper)
 Psammodynastes pulverulentus (Boie, 1827) (common mock viper)

References 

Pseudaspididae